Kristian "Kris" Weston (a.k.a. Thrash) (born 1972) is a British electronic musician, record producer and remixer best known for his work as a member of The Orb. Around the beginning of his career, he worked with Andrew Weatherall on remixes of Meat Beat Manifesto, remixed for Saint Etienne, U2 and others. He was still a teen when working on the first few albums by The Orb.

Thrash was with The Orb for less than five years, from around 1990 to the end of 1995. He appeared on the Orb albums and the many remixes they did during this period, including the album FFWD, a collaboration with Robert Fripp that is credited to Fripp, Thomas Fehlmann, Weston, and Alex Paterson. He also worked with Fortran 5 on their first album Blues.

Late 1980s-early 1990s
In 1990 and 1991, Weston performed remixes for many pop groups including Depeche Mode, Miranda Sex Garden, and Bananarama under the name Thrash.

The Orb
In 1991 while working as a studio engineer, Kris Weston was invited by Alex Paterson to accompany him in live performances of The Orb. His technical abilities allowed The Orb to craft panoramic sounds portraying aspects of space travel, especially the launch of Apollo 11 in their album The Orb's Adventures Beyond The Ultraworld.

Paterson and Weston wrote their next single, "Blue Room". Assisting with the recording was bassist Jah Wobble, keyboardist Miquette Giraudy, and guitarist Steve Hillage. This led to Weston and Paterson appearing on Top of the Pops where they played a game of chess in space suits with "Blue Room" playing in the background. He brought his technical and creative expertise to the Eno-influenced ambience on U.F.Orb.

Weston and Paterson, along with Robert Fripp and Thomas Fehlmann worked on the FFWD.  Soon after the release of FFWD in August 1994, Weston suddenly quit The Orb to pursue his own projects. Paterson stated that Weston's departure was due to Weston's desire to have more control over The Orb's projects.

However, in an interview with i-D, Weston reportedly attributed the split to Paterson, saying that Paterson "never did 50% of the work."

Post-Orb
In the early 2000s, Weston produced and remixed for Japanese music artist and singer Coppé. In 2003, Thrash formed Justablip Records, an Open Source/Creative Commons license style music label.

Discography

Orb albums with Kris Weston
 The Orb's Adventures Beyond the Ultraworld (1991), UK #29
 Aubrey Mixes: The Ultraworld Excursions (1991)
 U.F.Orb (1992), UK #1
 Live 93 (1993), UK #23
 Pomme Fritz (1994), UK #6
 FFWD (1994) The Orb and Robert Fripp
 Orbus Terrarum (1995), UK #20
 Auntie Aubrey's Excursions Beyond The Call Of Duty (1996)
 Auntie Aubrey's Excursions Beyond The Call Of Duty Pt 2 (2002)

Justablip Records discography
 BLIP001/BLIP 23CD : Various Artists WTF? Madonna Remix Project (2003)
 BLIP002 : Weapons of Mass Destruction (2004)
 BLIP003 : Petrol Observer Good Luck, Cunt/Iscream (2004)
 BLIP004 : The War Against Terror Go back to bed America (2004)

References

External links

krisweston.com

1972 births
Living people
Place of birth missing (living people)
English electronic musicians
English record producers
Remixers
The Orb members
Creative Commons-licensed authors